PolyStation is the popular name given to any shanzhai counterfeit video game console and Nintendo Entertainment System hardware clone that closely resembles a Sony PlayStation, particularly the PS1 variant. The cartridge slot of these systems is located under the lid which, on an original PlayStation, covers the disc drive.

History
It is not known for sure who created and manufactured the PolyStation. What is known is that the clone is a shanzhai console produced in China. Lebanese-Paraguayan trader Ali Ahmad Zaioum reportedly went so far as to register the console's brand and design to extort other sellers of the clone. However, he was accused by the Paraguayan court of falsifying documents and information in order to obtain registration with the Ministry of Industry and Commerce of Paraguay.

The console was very popular in the 2000s in many Latin American countries, mainly because it was sold at a low price. In 2015, PolyStations proved to be popular in parts of Argentina.

Variations of the PolyStation
PolyStation consoles are sold under many different names, including PS-Kid, Game Player, Play and Power, FunStation, and PSMan; there are also a number of variations on the PolyStation name, such as PolyStation II, PolyStation III and Super PolyStation. Some of these consoles resemble the original PlayStation, others the PSone redesign, and others the PlayStation 2. Recent variations of the PolyStation resemble the PlayStation 3, some of which sold under the name FunStation 3. Some variations include built-in unlicensed games, and in many cases these games are modified copies of licensed games; for example, in one modified copy of Super Mario Bros., Mario is replaced by Pikachu.

Other versions of the console include the PolyStation 2 and 3, which are small versions of the PlayStation 2 and 3 and come with an attachable controller. They have a small LCD screen, and are playable handheld games.

References

External links
 
 PolyStation on the Nintendo Player database

Unlicensed Nintendo Entertainment System hardware clones
Counterfeit consumer goods